Gush Katif Airport  was a small airfield in the Gaza Strip approximately  north of the town of Khan Yunis, and adjacent to the UNRWA Khan Younis refugee camp. It was immediately west of the former Israeli settlement of Ganei Tal, and named after the former Israeli settlement area of Gush Katif. Following the destruction of the Yasser Arafat International Airport it was briefly the only usable runway in the Gaza Strip, but in 2004 it was abandoned, and was overbuilt by 2015.

History

The airstrip should not be confused with RAF Gaza, which was in the vicinity of the present day Karni Crossing.

After the 1948 Palestinian exodus, 35,000 refugees took shelter in a camp to the south of the present day airfield. This has become the UNRWA Khan Younis camp.

As part of the unilateral disengagement of Israel from Gaza, Israeli settlers were evicted from the Gush Katif area in 2005.
In 2004, the airfield was in a good state of repair. The runway was kept clear, and runway markings were maintained. Following the handover to the Palestinian authorities along with the rest of Gush Katif, the airstrip was no longer maintained.

Present day

The UNRWA Khan Younis refugee camp is adjacent to and south of the former airstrip, and the UNRWA Khan Younis Vocational Training Centre, built in 2007, is immediately south of the runway. The camp houses over 68,000 refugees. 
In 2010 the main  runway was still sufficiently clear to be used, due to its use as an access road for UNRWA Khan Younis.

By 2014, it was clear from aerial imagery that expansion of UNRWA Khan Younis, including a sewage treatment plant constructed on the former runway threshold, made it entirely unusable.

References

Defunct airports
Airports in the Gaza Strip
Buildings and structures in Khan Yunis